Frédéric Gervais Husson (born 5 December 1976) is a French martial artist who represents his native country France in sport jujitsu (JJIF).

Career 
He grew up at suburb of Paris at Le Plessis-Trévise where he began with judo at age of 8. As teenager he preferred playing basketball and he returned to martial arts kind of sport at university around of age 21. Since 2001 he had been part of french national sport jujitsu team. His main discipline was fighting system where he is three times individual world champion – 2004, 2006, 2011. Since 2011 he is preferring discipline Brazilian jiu-jitsu whiche is part of JJIF championships since same year as Ne-waza (Jiu-jitsu).

Results

References

1976 births
Living people
French martial artists
World Games silver medalists
Competitors at the 2017 World Games